Tugnoli is an Italian surname. Notable people with the surname include:

Armando Tugnoli (born 1894), Italian Olympic weightlifter
Giuseppe Tugnoli (1888–1968), Italian discus thrower, javelin thrower, and shot putter
Lorenzo Tugnoli (born 1979), Italian photojournalist

Italian-language surnames